Francis O’Dea, OC (born 1945 in Montreal) is a Canadian entrepreneur, humanitarian and author. He left a lifestyle of homeless panhandling and in 1975 co-founded the Second Cup chain of coffee stores with Tom Culligan.

He is currently the Chair of the Bauen Group of Companies and is chair of the board of CUSO International CUSO International. He regularly speaks professionally on the subjects of his personal and business life.

He was involved with the founding of Proshred Holdings Ltd,. an international document destruction service (1986), and Samaritan Air Service, a regional air ambulance service (1989).

O'Dea became founding President of Renascent Treatment Foundation, (1983), founded Street Kids International (1988), and the Canadian Landmine Foundation (1999)., he initiated the international charity, Night of a Thousand Dinners (2000), with Colin Powell, Sir Paul McCartney, and Kofi Annan,  which resulted in 11,000 people sitting down to fundraising dinners in 29 countries all on the same night.

O'Dea has been Chief Executive Officer of Arxx Corporation, the once largest manufacturer and installer of Insulated Concrete Forms in North America. Arxx Corporation in 2008 acquired American PolySteel Llc. and Ecoblock Inc., American PolySteel founded in 1978 as Foam Form the oldest ICF manufacturer in North America traces its roots back  to Werner Gregori, the Canadian who was issued the first patent for insulating concrete forms in 1966, which American PolySteel owned the rights to. Arxx rebranded the Ecoblock and PolySteel product lines and continued expanding until 2014 when its North American assets and IP were acquired by Fox Blocks ICF and its Latin/South American assets and IP sold to AF Global Inc. the parent corporation of the Brazilian companies Bauen Capital S.A. and Arxx Building Products S.A..  Mr. O'Dea served as chairman of the board and chief executive officer of Arxx Corporation (alternate name, Arxx Building Products Inc.) positions he held since Arxx's beginning. He currently is chairman of the Board of Bauen Capital S.A. ("Grupo Bauen") a Canadian/Brazilian asset management firm which acquired the Latin American asset division of Arxx  Corporation technologies. Frank currently serves as Chairman of Arxx Brasil S.A. the Brazilian corporation that produces and commercializes Arxx ICF (Insulated Concrete Forms).

O'Dea is also a co-founder of True North, a Toronto-based impact investing fund which was one of the top suppliers of personal protective equipment for the Canadian federal government during the COVID-19 pandemic in Canada.

Books
2007: When All You Have is Hope (Penguin Canada) 
 2013  Do The Next Right Thing: Surviving Life's Crises (Penguin Canada)

References

External links
 Order of Canada citation: Frank O'Dea
 Frank O'Dea Interview on The Hour with George Stroumboulopoulos
The History of American PolySteel. Llc. https://www.icfmag.com/2008/04/american-polysteel-turns-30/
História das Fôrmas ICF (Insulated Concrete Forms) https://pt.linkedin.com/pulse/história-das-fôrmas-icf-insulated-concrete-forms-marina-lima
 

1945 births
Living people
Businesspeople from Ottawa
Businesspeople from Montreal
Officers of the Order of Canada
Businesspeople in coffee
Writers from Montreal
Writers from Ottawa
Royal Roads University